Broadsword calling Danny Boy may refer to:

A notable phrase spoken by Richard Burton from the film Where Eagles Dare
A 2006 song by Tomcraft featuring Jimmy Pop
A 2018 book by Geoff Dyer about the film

See also
Broadsword
Danny Boy